The freguesias (civil parishes) of Portugal are listed in by municipality according to the following format:
 concelho
 freguesias

Nazaré
Famalicão
Nazaré
Valado dos Frades

Nelas
Aguieira
Canas de Senhorim
Carvalhal Redondo
Lapa do Lobo
Moreira
Nelas
Santar
Senhorim
Vilar Seco

Nisa
Alpalhão
Amieira do Tejo
Arez e Amieira do Tejo
Espírito Santo, Nossa Senhora da Graça e São Simão
Montalvão
Santana
Tolosa

Nordeste (Azores)
Achada
Achadinha
Algarvia
Lomba da Fazenda
Nordeste
Salga
Santana
Santo António de Nordestinho
São Pedro de Nordestinho

N